Martin A. Pedroza (born July 20, 1965 in Panama City, Panama) is a jockey in American Thoroughbred horse racing.

Pedroza trained at the Panama jockey school and in 1981 rode his first winner at Hipódromo Presidente Remón in Panama City. He emigrated to California for the 1983 racing season where he won more races than any other apprentice jockey during three meets at Santa Anita Park, Oak Tree and Los Alamitos. He is considered one of the best jockeys of all time.

Major racing accomplishments
Martin Pedroza won six consecutive races at Santa Anita Park on October 31, 1992, equaling that track's record held by Steve Valdez in 1973 and equalled by Darrel McHargue in 1979 and by Laffit Pincay Jr. in 1987 and Patrick Valenzuela in 1988. Of the four record holders, only Pedroza earned his wins in successive races. In 2008, he won his 3000th career race at Fairplex Park on a day when he won a record seven races then followed up with another seven-race win day just two days later.

At the 2005 Hollywood Park 2005 fall meet, Martin Pedroza won more races than any other jockey and in 2010 he won his thirteenth riding title at Fairplex Park, twelve of which have been consecutive since 1999. Pedroza's longtime agent is Richie Silverstein

As at August 28, 2011, Martin Pedroza has won 3,346 races.

Year-end charts

References

1965 births
Living people
Panamanian jockeys
American jockeys
Sportspeople from Panama City
Panamanian emigrants to the United States